The 1974 Texas Longhorns football team represented the University of Texas at Austin in the 1974 NCAA Division I football season.  The Longhorns finished the regular season with an 8–3 record and lost to Auburn in the 1974 Gator Bowl. This was the first season where Texas, alongside Ohio State, Army, and Notre Dame, played an 11-game regular season schedule. Many schools had been playing 11 games since it was first permitted by the NCAA in 1970.

Schedule

References

Texas
Texas Longhorns football seasons
Texas Longhorns football